Shopping for Love is an Australian reality show television program. Airing on the Nine Network, it is hosted by Pete Lazer and Andi Lew and premiered on 4 December 2005.

References

2000s Australian reality television series
Nine Network original programming
2005 Australian television series debuts